Clypidina is a genus of sea snails, marine gastropod mollusks in the family Fissurellidae, the keyhole limpets.

Species
Species within the genus Clypidina include:

 Clypidina notata (Linnaeus, 1758)
 † Clypidina thurgensis Gray, 1847

References

Fissurellidae
Taxa named by John Edward Gray